Rear Admiral Sameer Saxena, AVSM, NM is a serving Flag officer in the Indian Navy. He currently serves as the Flag Officer Commanding Gujarat Naval Area. He earlier served as the Flag Officer Commanding Western Fleet and as the Naval adviser to the High Commissioner of India to the United Kingdom at India House, London.

Early life and education
Saxena was born to Commodore MML Saxena, an officer in the Indian Navy. His uncle, Commodore HML Saxena, also was a naval officer.

Saxena joined and graduated from the National Defence Academy, Pune. He also attended the Defence Services Staff College, Wellington and the Naval War College, Newport, Rhode Island.

Naval career
Saxena was commissioned into the Indian Navy on 1 July 1989. He is a specialist in navigation and direction. He served in the direction team of the aircraft carrier . He also served as the navigation officer of the Khukri-class corvette , the lead ship of her class of guided missile frigates  and the lead ship of her class of guided missile destroyers .

In his staff appointments, Saxena has served in the Directorate of personnel and as the Naval Assistant (NA) to the Chief of the Naval Staff. He also served as the Principal Director of Foreign Cooperation at NHQ. He also served in training appointments at his alma mater, the National Defence Academy, and the Centre for Leadership and Behavioural Studies.

Saxena has commanded the Seaward-class defense boat of the Mauritius Coast Guard, MCGS Guardian. He subsequently commanded the Kora-class corvette . He then served as the executive officer of the Delhi-class destroyer  and commanded another ship of the same class of guided missile destroyers .

In March 2016, as a Commodore, he was appointed the Naval advisor to the High Commissioner of India to the United Kingdom at the High Commission of India, London. The High Commissioners during his tenure were Yashvardhan Kumar Sinha and Ruchi Ghanashyam. On 26 January 2017, he was awarded the Nau Sena Medal for devotion to duty.

Flag rank
Saxena was promoted to flag rank in February 2020 and was appointed Assistant Chief of Naval Staff (Policy and Plans) (ACNS P&P) at naval headquarters. 
He took command of the Western Fleet on 27 December 2021 as the Flag Officer Commanding Western Fleet from Rear Admiral Ajay Kochhar. After a tenure of about a year as FOCWF, Saxena relinquished charge and handed over command to Rear Admiral Vineet McCarty on 15 November 2022. On 27 November, he took over charge as the Flag Officer Commanding Gujarat Naval Area (FOGNA). On 26 January 2023, he was awarded the Ati Vishisht Seva Medal for his tenure as FOCWF.

Awards and decorations

Bibliography

See also
 Flag Officer Commanding Western Fleet
 Western Fleet

References 

Indian Navy admirals
Living people
National Defence Academy (India) alumni
Naval War College alumni
Flag Officers Commanding Western Fleet
Year of birth missing (living people)
Recipients of the Nau Sena Medal
Indian naval attachés
Defence Services Staff College alumni